Duo is an album by pianist Cedar Walton and bassist David Williams which was recorded in Italy 1990 and originally released on the Italian Red label. The album was first released as Off Minor due to a mistake incorrectly identifying the track "I Mean You" as another Thelonious Monk tune and as a result, the title and jacket were changed but the recorded contents remained the same.

Reception 

The review on AllMusic states "One of Cedar Walton's best recordings ... The communication between Walton and Williams is superb."

Track listing 
All compositions by Cedar Walton except where noted
 "I Mean You" (Thelonious Monk) – 5:24 Incorrectly identified as "Off Minor" on original release
 "Pannonica" (Monk) – 5:43
 "Stablemates" (Benny Golson) – 6:21
 "Lament" (J. J. Johnson) – 9:46
 "N.P.S." – 6:13
 "My Old Flame" (Arthur Johnston, Sam Coslow) – 6:56
 "St. Thomas" (Sonny Rollins) – 5:42
 "Hagy" – 10:38
 "Blues for Alberto" – 6:40
 "I've Grown Accustomed to Your Face" (Frederick Loewe, Alan Jay Lerner) – 5:10
 "Ruby, My Dear" (Monk) – 7:51

Personnel 
Cedar Walton – piano
David Williams – bass
Gaspare Pasini – alto saxophone (track 11)

References 

Cedar Walton albums
David "Happy" Williams albums
1991 albums
Red Records albums